Mahwa is a census town in Mahwa Mandal, Dausa district in the Indian state of Rajasthan.

Geography 
Mahwa, Jaipur, Dausa and Bharatpur are all situated on NH-11 (Agra to Bikaner).

Demographics 

, Mahwa had a population more than 19,558. Males constitute 53% of the population and females 47%. Mahwa has an average literacy rate of 60%, higher than the national average of 59.5%: male literacy is 72%, and female literacy is 47%. In Mahwa, 20% of the population is under 6 years of age.

References 

Cities and towns in Dausa district